Irish Council may refer to:
 Irish Privy Council, formal executive of Ireland before 1922
 Irish Council Bill, 1907 proposal for an Irish Council with administrative powers

See also
 Council of Ireland (disambiguation)
 Irish Society (disambiguation)
 Local government in Ireland (disambiguation), most local authorities are governed by councils.